SC Tiligul-Tiras Tiraspol was a Moldovan football club based in Tiraspol. They played in the Divizia Naţională, the top division in Moldovan football. Their home stadium was Stadionul Municipal. Currently the club's football academy is associated with another Moldovan club FC Zaria Bălți and competes in football competitions as its reserve team in lower Moldovan leagues.

History

Names
 Spartak (1938 in Ukrainian SSR)
 Pischevik (1961–1962)
 Luceafărul (1963–1965)
 Dnestr (1967, 1968–1969)
 Energiya (1967)
 Start (1978)
 Avtomobilist (1979–1985)  
 Tekstilschik (1986–1989)
 Tiras (1990)
 Tiligul (1991–2003)
 Tiligul-Tiras (2004–2009)
 Olimpia-2-Tiligul (2009–2011)
 Olimpia-2 (2011–2014)
 Zaria-2 Bălți (2014–present)

Historical outlook
Tiligul Tiraspol was the original and oldest football team in Tiraspol, the capital of Transnistria. It was traditionally the city's only team, but in 2002 the team formerly known as Constructorul Chişinău moved to Tiraspol and changed its name to FC Tiraspol, and the same year FC Sheriff was founded as well, thus bringing the number of home teams to three. If the USSR had not dissolved, they would have played in the USSR Top League in 1992, because they were runners-up of the USSR First League in 1991. Since the establishment of the National championship, the club along with Zimbru Chişinău were main contenders for the top titles. With establishing of Sheriff Tiraspol, Tiligul has faded away and eventually creased its operations. Sheriff became the best club not only in the city but across the whole Republic of Moldova.

Among its most famous former players is Serghei Covalciuc, who was discovered in 1999 and was hired to play for Spartak Moscow.

Tiligul took part in European club competitions five times but never won a match in either Cup Winner's Cup or UEFA Cup qualifying which makes them one of the rare teams to have played at least 10 matches in European club competitions (Intertoto Cup excluded) without scoring any victories (though the record for being the least successful team in European club competitions is believed to be Etzella Ettelbruck (Luxembourg) because Etzella lost all their twelve games in UEFA Cup qualifying rounds between 2001 and 2007).

Tiligul's colors were crimson shirts and shorts at home and either white shirts and shorts or violet shirts and shorts on the road.

Tiligul-Tiras had to cease operations after they were not able to provide the necessary funds to keep the club alive.

Later the club found agreement with another Moldavian club FC Olimpia, yielding its club's infrastructure for adaptation of the Olimpia's farm team Olimpia-2 as Olimpia-2 Tiligul.

Achievements
Moldovan Cup
 Winners (3): 1992–93, 1993–94, 1994–95

Divizia A
 Winners (1): 2002–03

Football Championship of the Moldovan SSR
 Winners (4): 1956, 1965, 1987, 1989

European record

List of seasons

See also
 SKA Odessa, represented Tiraspol in 1972–1975 as Zvezda Tiraspol

References

External links
 Tiligul-Tiras Tiraspol  at weltfussballarchiv.com
 Team profile, sports.md

 
Football clubs in Moldova
Defunct football clubs in Moldova
Association football clubs established in 1938
Association football clubs disestablished in 2009
1938 establishments in Ukraine
2009 disestablishments in Moldova
Tiraspol
Football clubs in Transnistria
Football clubs in the Moldavian Soviet Socialist Republic